Mir Bacha Kot District is situated in the central part of Kabul Province, Afghanistan. It has a population of 5,000 and another 37,000 are expected to return in the near future (2002 official UNHCR est.). Tajiks are the majority and some Pashtuns also live there.

Mir Bacha Kot district borders Shakardara District to the west, Guldara and Kalakan districts to the north, and Deh Sabz District to the east.  Its headquarters is Mir Bacha Kot village, which is located in the central part of the district, 25 km north of Kabul. The district was almost fully destroyed during the war and now is undergoing a rebuilding process. The main source of income is  agriculture.

References

External links 
 Mir Bacha Kot district Map (Source: AIMS)

Districts of Kabul Province